Hubert Meen Aucoin (December 17, 1874 – January 29, 1952) was a merchant and political figure in Nova Scotia, Canada. He represented Inverness County in the Nova Scotia House of Assembly from 1925 to 1928 as a Liberal-Conservative member.

He was born in Chéticamp, Nova Scotia, the son of Anselm Aucoin and Hélène Daigle. In 1899, he married Luce Arsenault. Aucoin died in Halifax on January 29, 1952.

References 
 A Directory of the Members of the Legislative Assembly of Nova Scotia, 1758-1958, Public Archives of Nova Scotia (1958)

1874 births
1952 deaths
Progressive Conservative Association of Nova Scotia MLAs
People from Inverness County, Nova Scotia